Sexpot Comedy is a comedy collective, producing or sponsoring nine podcasts and more than a dozen weekly or monthly live events in Denver, Colorado. It is run by partners Kayvan Soorena Tyler Khalatbari-Limaki (Kayvan Khalatbari), a local entrepreneur, and Andy Juett, a local comedian and producer.

History
In July 2012, Khalatbari combined two of his existing businesses—Sexy Pizza, a Denver-based pizza chain, and Denver Relief, one of Colorado's oldest marijuana dispensaries—to create a comedy showcase called Sexpot Comedy. Staged in one of Sexy Pizza's three locations, these invite-only stand-up shows allowed Denver Relief's medical marijuana patients to smoke while watching sets from some of Denver's comedians.

Shortly after the launch, Juett joined on as a producing partner of Sexpot. Along with the namesake showcase, the Sexpot brand started sponsoring four Denver podcasts (all hosted or co-hosted by area comedians), and several local comedy festivals, open mics, and special events. The brand has since expanded and launched their website in October 2014 which features their network of podcasts and a show calendar.

Podcasts

Featured Podcasts

As of October 2014, Sexpot Comedy sponsors six featured podcasts and three up-and-coming podcasts in their farm league:

My Dining Room Table

Grabbing Lunch with Matt Knudsen

The Narrators

The Unicorn

These Things Matter

Whiskey and Cigarettes

Farm League Podcasts

Werewolf Radar

The Other Side

Empty Girlfriend

Sexpot's Monthly Showcase
The showcase evolved from the first shows held as invite-only parties inside a Sexy Pizza, and moved to the Oriental Theater in December, 2013. The larger iteration of the show has featured guests including: Rory Scovel, Sean Patton, Nikki Glaser, Andy Kindler, and LA comedy group WOMEN, as well as local talent. Comedy Works New Faces winner Jordan Doll hosts and Juett produces the events.

Hosted by Jordan Doll and Andy Juett, every monthly showcase also features pre-show activity during Sexpot Vision with Jim Hickox.

Weirdo Olympics
February 28, 2014 with Nikki Glaser, David Gborie, Ben Kronberg, Sam Tallent and Kevin O'Brien

Vernal Equinox
March 21, 2014 with Rory Scovel, Chris Fairbanks, Andrew Orvedahl, Kristin Rand, and Chris Charpentier

Midnight Run
April 17, 2014 with Andy Haynes, Billy Wayne Davis, Nathan Lund, Noah Gardenswartz, Ian Douglas Terry, and Nathan Lund

Sexpot American Summer
May 30, 2014 with Andy Kindler, Chuck Roy, Bobby Crane, Christie Buchele, and Mara Wiles. Hosted by Alex Falcone.

WOMEN: Sexpot in the City
June 21, 2014 with Jake Weisman, Dave Ross, Pat Bishop, and Allen Strickland Williams

High Plains Comedy Festival Preview
July 18, 2014 with Aparna Nancherla, Ashley Barnhill, Sean Patton, and Ian Douglas Terry

Sexpot at the 2nd Annual High Plains Comedy Festival
August 22, 2014 with Kumail Nanjiani, Chris Fairbanks, The Walsh Brothers, Andy Haynes, Billy Wayne Davis, and Eugene Cordero

Sexpot's Aerial Menagerie
September 19, 2014 with Dan St. Germain, David Huntsberger, Brock Wilbur, Haley Driscoll, and Jay Gillespie

Sexpot's Selfie Showcase
October 24, 2014 with Hampton Yount, Drennon Davis, Sammy Arechar, Anthony Crawford, and Aaron Urist

Recurring Live Shows
In addition to the podcasts and their live components, the Sexpot brand sponsors or produces more than a dozen regular live shows around Denver. As of October 2014, those include:

Boulder Comedy Show
Hosted at Boulder’s Bohemian Biergarten by comic Brent Gill, the Boulder Comedy Show is the city’s only free weekly showcase. Featuring comedians from around the Denver metro area and country.

Cartoons and Comedy
Organizer Christopher Baker brings three local comedians together for a live commentary of Saturday morning cartoons and commercials of the ‘80s and ‘90s. Sexpot also provides cereal and milk for the audience to better capture the Saturday morning nostalgia.

Comics Against Civility
Hosted by Jake Browne and Zac Maas, this game show is a spin on the Cards Against Humanity board game. Panels of local comedians create their own “answer” cards in advance, and audience members submit the “questions.” The comedians then choose from their own cards, with the audience's reaction choosing the winner of each round.

Crom Comedy Festival
An annual alternative stand-up comedy festival that started in Omaha, Nebraska in 2013 and added a second festival in Denver in 2015.  Curated by Ian Douglas Terry, Andy Juett, and Zach Reinert.  Former headliners include Howard Kremer, Ron Funches, Sean Patton, The Grawlix, Rory Scovel, Kyle Kinane, Ben Kronberg, and Brooks Wheelan.

Doom Room
Recent Omaha transplants (and now Denver-based) comedians Zach Reinert and Ian Douglas Terry host this monthly show at 3 Kings Tavern. Local and touring comedians perform stand-up sets on the fly based on topics that pop up on the patented "Screen of Doom".

Governor Jack Watches You While You Sleep
Comedy troupe Governor Jack—one of the longest-running improv and sketch comedy groups in Denver—interviews a visiting improviser before improvising scenes based on the interview answers. Staged at Denver's Voodoo Comedy Playhouse.

Greater Than Social Club
Produced in conjunction with Illegal Pete's Greater Than Collective label, Greater Than Social Club is a modern-day, monthly cabaret-style show at Denver's Lannie's Clocktower. The show combines local and national comedians with alternative bands and is hosted by comedian Kristin Rand.

High Plains Comedy Festival
High Plains Comedy Festival is a comedy festival held each August in Denver. Founded in 2013, it is organized by Denver comedian/writer Adam Cayton-Holland and Sexpot partner Juett, and features a mix of local and national comics in venues throughout the Baker neighborhood.

Lucha Libre & Laughs
This blend of Mexican wrestling and comedy is produced and refereed by comedian and filmmaker Nick Gossert at the Oriental Theater. Local comedians perform stand-up sets before providing color commentary of live pro-wrestling matches.

Offensively Delicious
An annual kick-off event for Great American Beer Festival, Offensively Delicious features unlimited tastings from ten breweries as well as comedy from both the brewers themselves and two comedians.

The 2014 edition featured Nikki Glaser and Adam Cayton-Holland

The Other Side Podcast Live!
A live edition of Bradley Haltom's Other Side Podcast, held every month at Voodoo Comedy Playhouse.

Propaganda!
Host/producer Matt Monroe puts on this monthly showcase at Lannie's Clocktower Cabaret. The show is totally free and regularly features a combination of local and national comedians. The show was named Best Comedy Night in Westword's Best of Denver Award 2014.

Sexpot Open Mic
Host Jeff M. Albright hosts this standup comedy open mic at Goosetown Tavern every Monday night.

Too Much Fun!
The Fine Gentleman's Club (FGC)—consisting of Denver comedians Chris Charpentier, Bobby Crane, Nathan Lund, and Sam Tallent—hosts this free weekly showcase at Denver's Deer Pile performance space. The FGC introduce each show and perform individual standup between their guests’ sets. Past guests have included Brooks Wheelan, Jules Posner, Josh Blue, and Dave Chappelle.

Too Much Funstival
The Fine Gentleman's Club has also put on a loosely organized comedy festival in the fall annually since 2011. The festival mainly consists of local comedians and bands performing at small venues in the Capitol Hill and RiNo neighborhoods.

References

Companies based in Denver
Mass media companies of the United States
American companies established in 2012
2012 establishments in Colorado